Bramalea—Gore—Malton—Springdale was a provincial electoral district in central Ontario, Canada that elected one Member of the Legislative Assembly of Ontario. It was created in 1999 from Brampton North, Brampton South and Mississauga North. It was abolished in 2007 into Bramalea—Gore—Malton, Brampton—Springdale and Mississauga—Brampton South.

The riding included Brampton east of Dixie Road and Mississauga east of Hurontario Street and north of the 401.

Members of Provincial Parliament
Raminder Gill, Ontario Progressive Conservative Party (1999–2003)
Kuldip Kular, Ontario Liberal Party (2003–2007)

Election results

Former provincial electoral districts of Ontario
Politics of Brampton
Politics of Mississauga